The Bobov Synagogue in Kraków, Poland, was established in 1871 by followers of Rabbi Shlomo Halberstam of Bobov.

Located at 12 Estery Street, the synagogue was founded on the first story of an apartment block and also contained a Talmudic school which was situated adjacent to the prayer hall. During World War II, the Nazis vandalized the synagogue. At the end of the war, the synagogue was converted into apartments. Since the summer of 1990, it has been used as a hostel for the poor. Nothing remains today indicating its former use as a synagogue.

See also
History of Jews in Poland

References

Hasidic synagogues
Synagogues completed in 1871
Former synagogues in Poland
Bobov (Hasidic dynasty)
Orthodox synagogues in Poland
Synagogues in Kraków
Holocaust locations in Poland
19th-century religious buildings and structures in Poland